Indium chloride may refer to:

 Indium trichloride (indium(III) chloride), InCl3
  (indium(I) chloride), InCl
 Indium dichloride (indium(II) chloride), InCl2